Worst Year of My Life Again is an Australian children's television series that premiered on 26 April 2014 on ABC3. It was produced by the Australian Children's Television Foundation (ACTF) and Reflective Pictures for the Australian Broadcasting Corporation. Filming for the show began on 23 April 2013 at Camberwell High School and ended on 15 November 2013. The show also aired on CBBC. On 18 October 2014, the show's cancellation was announced.

Synopsis
When Alex King goes to bed on the eve of his 15th birthday, he is relieved that the last disastrous year is finally over. But when he wakes up, time has reset itself and he's going to have to relive the worst year of his life all over again.

Cast
Ned Napier as Alex King, the main character who has the bad luck. Clumsy, awkward, timid, and impulsive, his attempts to alter the timeloop usually leads to disaster and humiliation for him.  
Laurence Boxhall as Simon Birch, Alex's main best friend. He is quirky, quick-witted and comical. He also loves Alex's older sister, Sam, though she doesn't feel the same. He also can be cocky and overconfident, which gets him into trouble often. He claims to be of English heritage.
Tiarnie Coupland as Maddy Kent, Alex's friend. She is very intelligent, yet ditzy and spontaneous, with a bit of a bubbly side. She is trying to convince Alex that he doesn't belong with Nicola because she secretly has a liking towards him (though he never realizes this at all) and also explaining why the universe reset his year.
Lana Golja as Nicola Grey, Alex's love interest. Blonde and beautiful, but also self-centered and a snobbish bully, she was even said to "stuff a kid in a very small backpack." She was also said to have, "stuck a sausage up a boy's nose!" She tolerates Alex but clearly has no feelings for him.
Xander Speight as Parker, the school bully. Parker and his assistant, Howe (Liam Erck), humiliate Alex wherever they can. His last name or reasons for bullying are never revealed.
Liam Erck as Howe, Parker's assistant
Kaiting Yap as Loren, Nicola's snobbish friend
Jessie Blott as Amy, also Nicola's rude friend 
Bellamy Duke as Big Hannah, an unusually tall, tough girl who has a crush on Alex.
Fergus McLaren as Toby McPherson
Arielle O'Neil as Samantha King, Alex's elder sister. She is usually dominant over Alex despite him being considerably taller than her. Sam seems to enjoy seeing her brother's antics turn into humiliation for him, whereas she often has good fortunes. Like Parker, she picks on Alex and often blackmails him for her own pleasures.
Annie Jones as Johanna King, Alex and Sam's rather naive mother. She can be well-intentioned but also rash.
Jeremy Stanford as Lanford King, Alex and Sam's father. He has an unhealthy competitive streak that can work against him at times, leading to great humiliation.
Syd Brisbane as Quinnford Norris, the school dean and math teacher. An extremely bitter, insensitive, and disciplinary man, he often gives detentions at the drop of a hat. Quinnford seldom smiles, rather always having a scowl on his face, despises romance, music, and art, and believes all children deserve harsh punishments for goofing off. He has a deep hatred of Alex (though he is often hostile and unfriendly towards many other students too), treating him coldly for being late for class or just merely encountering him in the hall. His first name or why he hates Alex so deeply are never mentioned. However it probably resulted from an incident from his past with Alex's father, who was formerly his best friend.
Kingsley O'Connor as Troy, Seagate's very own sporting superstar who is captain of the boys' football team. However, his grades are less than adequate in other subjects.

Episodes

References

External links

Australian Broadcasting Corporation original programming
Australian children's television series
Australian drama television series
English-language television shows
2013 Australian television series debuts
Australian comedy-drama television series
Television series about teenagers
Time loop television series